Pascal McConnell is a former Gaelic footballer who played for the Tyrone county team. 

He is an All-Ireland Senior Football Championship winner.

McConnell competed with John Devine and Niall Morgan to be first choice goalkeeper for Tyrone.

Early life and family
McConnell's older brother is Tyrone's All Star-winning goalkeeper of the nineties, Finbar McConnell.

Playing career
In 1998, McConnell played alongside Stephen O'Neill in the MacRory Cup semi-final for Omagh CBS.  

Over the course of his career with Tyrone GAA, McConnell helped win three All-Ireland senior medals for the county.

Retirement
McConnell announced his retirement from inter-county football in November 2013. 

When asked about this decision, McConnell said, "There is a big commitment required in order to stay performing at the top level and I feel the time is right to bow out and start a new chapter in my life. I have absolutely no regrets from my playing career with Tyrone, although, I suppose if I was a bit greedy, I would say that I felt that we could have won the All Ireland in 2009 and 2010." 

His retirement from inter-county football left Conor Gormley, Dermot Carlin, Stephen O'Neill and Seán Cavanagh as the only remaining links to the Tyrone team that won the county's first All-Ireland senior title in 2003.

References

http://www.breakingnews.ie/archives/2004/0804/sport/kfgbauaueygb/
http://www.westernpeople.ie/news/story.asp?j=36557&cat=sport

1980 births
Living people
Gaelic football goalkeepers
Newtownstewart St Eugene's Gaelic footballers
Tyrone inter-county Gaelic footballers
Winners of two All-Ireland medals (Gaelic football)